Omorgus carinatus is a beetle of the family Trogidae. It is found in the United States and Mexico.

References

carinatus
Insects of Mexico
Beetles of the United States
Beetles described in 1922